Liga Perdana was the top-tier football league in Malaysia that operated from 1994 to 1997. The league was formed and established in 1994 to succeed the Liga Semi-Pro and became the Malaysian fully professional football league. At this time the league was interchangeably referred as Malaysian League.

As per league rules for the newly formed professional league, all teams were required to register 13 full professional, two semi-professional, and only three foreign players to play for their team in the competition. The inaugural season started on 5 April 1994.

The league was then succeeded in 1998 by the formation of Liga Perdana 1 when the league was divided into two division alongside the Liga Perdana 2 by Football Association of Malaysia.

History

Founding 
A football league competition involving the representative sides of the state football associations was first held in Malaysia in 1979. When it began, it was intended primarily as a qualifying tournament for the final knock-out stages of the Malaysia Cup. It was not  until 1982 that a league trophy was introduced to recognise the winners of the preliminary stage as the league champions. Over the years, the league competition has gained important stature in its own right.

In early days, the Malaysian football league system consisted of an amateur league before the changes in 1989, when the Liga Semi-Pro was introduced which operated from 1989 to 1993.

Initially the only teams allowed to participate in the league were the state FA's sides, teams representing the Armed Forces and the Police, and teams representing the neighbouring countries of Singapore and Brunei (though the Football Association of Singapore pulled out of the Malaysian League after the 1994 season following a dispute with the Football Association of Malaysia over gate receipts, and has not been involved since).

In its inaugural season 16 teams competing in the league. The teams were based from all states in Malaysia including Kuala Lumpur and addition of two foreign teams, Singapore and Brunei.

Between 1994 and 1997, there was no second level league as the top two leagues were combined. 1994 was when Malaysian football league turned professional. The Liga Semi-Pro essentially replaced by the Liga Perdana, the new professional national league which was added, and a second cup competition, Piala FA, joined the existing Malaysia Cup.

The newly formed professional football league was almost in peril when a bribing and corruption scandal was discovered between 1994 and 1995. 21 players and coaches was sacked, 58 players were suspended and 126 players were questioned over corruption by Malaysian authorities.

FAM did create another amateur league in 1992 for local clubs in Malaysia to compete, which is called the National League (Liga Nasional in Malay) The league was managed by FAM outside entity, Super Club Sdn. Bhd. Unfortunately, the league only ran for one season before it folded. Some of the clubs were then evolved and joined the main league where in 1997, promotion from Malaysia FAM Cup to the professional M-League was introduced for the first time. Johor FC and NS Chempaka FC were the first two sides to be promoted that year.

Liga Perdana was replaced by two divisions league in 1998 consist of Liga Perdana 1 and Liga Perdana 2 (Liga Perdana 1 and Liga Perdana 2 in Malay). During 1998, Liga Perdana 1 consist of 12 teams while Liga Perdana 2 had 8 teams. 10 teams that previously qualified for Malaysia Cup which played in 1997 Liga Perdana were automatically qualified to Liga Perdana 1. The other two spots were filled by a playoff round of the 5 lowest teams in the 1997 Liga Perdana and the Malaysian Olympic football team. The lowest four teams from the playoff round were then put into Liga Perdana 2 alongside Police, Malaysia Military, Negeri Sembilan Chempaka F.C and PKN Johor. At this time the league still consisted of semi-pro team where each team was allowed to register 25 players where 12 players must be a professional for Liga Perdana 1 and a minimum of six professional players in Liga Perdana 2.

Teams 
In its inaugural season 16 teams competing in the league. The teams were based from all states in Malaysia including Kuala Lumpur and addition of two foreign teams, Singapore and Brunei.

Teams competing in 1994 season 
16 teams competing in the first season of Liga Perdana.

  Singapore
  Brunei
  Sarawak
  Kedah
  Sabah
  Selangor
  Perlis
  Negeri Sembilan
  Perak
  Kuala Lumpur
  Pahang
  Pulau Pinang
  Kelantan
  Terengganu
  Johor
  Malacca

League Table:-

1.Singapore  - 59 PTS (1994 Liga Perdana Champions)

2.Kedah  - 57 PTS

3.Sarawak  - 55 PTS

4.Sabah  - 49 PTS

5.Pahang  - 46 PTS

6.Selangor  - 44 PTS

7.Terengganu  - 43 PTS

8.Johor  - 41 PTS

9.Kelantan  - 40 PTS

10.Perak  - 35 PTS

11.Kuala Lumpur  - 33 PTS

12.Negeri Sembilan  - 31 PTS

13.Malacca  - 31 PTS

14.Perlis  - 20 PTS

15.Pulau Pinang  - 19 PTS

16.Brunei  - 13 PTS

Teams competing in 1995 season 
15 teams competing in the second season of Liga Perdana after Singapore pull from the league.

  Pahang
  Sarawak
  Kedah
  Sabah
  Selangor
  Perlis
  Negeri Sembilan
  Perak
  Kuala Lumpur
  Pulau Pinang
  Kelantan
  Terengganu
  Johor
  Malacca
  Brunei

League Table:-

1.Pahang  - 65 PTS (1995 Liga Perdana Champions)

2.Selangor  - 54 PTS

3.Sarawak  - 54 PTS

4.Kedah  - 45 PTS

5.Sabah  - 44 PTS

6.Johor  - 42 PTS

7.Perak  - 40 PTS

8.Terengganu  - 39 PTS

9.Brunei  - 36 PTS

10.Perlis  - 32 PTS

11.Negeri Sembilan  - 30 PTS

12.Kuala Lumpur  - 28 PTS

13.Malacca  - 26 PTS

14.Pulau Pinang  - 24 PTS

15.Kelantan  - 23 PTS

Teams competing in 1996 season 
15 teams competing in the third season of Liga Perdana.

  Sabah
  Sarawak
  Kedah
  Selangor
  Perlis
  Negeri Sembilan
  Perak
  Kuala Lumpur
  Pahang
  Pulau Pinang
  Kelantan
  Terengganu
  Johor
  Malacca
  Brunei

League Table:-

1.Sabah  - 58 PTS (1996 Liga Perdana Champions)

2.Kedah  - 57 PTS

3.Negeri Sembilan  - 57 PTS

4.Selangor  - 49 PTS

5.Brunei  - 44 PTS

6.Pulau Pinang  - 41 PTS

7.Sarawak  - 40 PTS

8.Perak  - 40 PTS

9.Johor  - 37 PTS

10.Perlis  - 36 PTS

11.Pahang  - 33 PTS

12.Malacca  - 27 PTS

13.Terengganu  - 20 PTS

14.Kuala Lumpur  - 18 PTS

15.Kelantan  - 17 PTS

Teams competing in 1997 season 
15 teams competing in the last season of Liga Perdana before it was succeeded by Liga Perdana 1.

  Sarawak
  Kedah
  Sabah
  Selangor
  Perlis
  Negeri Sembilan
  Perak
  Kuala Lumpur
  Pahang
  Pulau Pinang
  Kelantan
  Terengganu
  Johor
  Malacca
  Brunei

League Table:-

1.Sarawak  - 54 PTS (1997 Liga Perdana Champions)

2.Kedah  - 50 PTS

3.Sabah  - 49 PTS

4.Selangor  - 46 PTS

5.Brunei  - 45 PTS

6.Perlis  - 45 PTS

7.Negeri Sembilan  - 44 PTS

8.Perak  - 41 PTS

9.Kuala Lumpur  - 38 PTS

10.Pahang  - 37 PTS

11.Pulau Pinang  - 33 PTS

12.Johor  - 32 PTS  (Relegated to Liga Perdana 2)

13.Kelantan  - 28 PTS  (Relegated to Liga Perdana 2)

14.Malacca  - 24 PTS  (Relegated to Liga Perdana 2)

15.Terengganu  - 22 PTS  (Relegated to Liga Perdana 2)

Champions 
Below is the list of champions of Liga Perdana from 1994 until 1997.

References 

 
2
Second level football leagues in Asia
Sports leagues established in 1994
Sports leagues disestablished in 1997
1994 establishments in Malaysia
1997 disestablishments in Malaysia